The 1945 Nevada Wolf Pack football team was an American football team that represented the University of Nevada as an independent during the 1945 college football season. In their seventh under head coach Jim Aiken, the Wolf Pack compiled a 7–3 record.

The team included two veterans who had been injured in World War II and a former prisoner of war.

Schedule

References

Nevada
Nevada Wolf Pack football seasons
Nevada Wolf Pack football